The KBO League Rookie of the Year Award is given to the player judged the best first-year player in the Korea Baseball Organization (KBO) League. The most recent winner is Lee Jung-hoo of the Nexen Heroes.

Award winners

References

KBO League trophies and awards
Rookie player awards
South Korean awards